George Muff, 1st Baron Calverley (10 February 1877 – 20 September 1955) was a British Liberal then Labour politician.

Childhood 
Muff was the son of George Muff, a miner of Bradford, Yorkshire, and his wife Sarah Jane (née Hodgson), and initially worked as a textile worker.

Speaking in 1948, Muff described how as a child he narrowly avoided being sent to the workhouse and shipped off to Australia as a result of his family's poverty. In the event, for part of his childhood Muff was raised by his neighbors.

Political career 
At the 1918 General election he stood as Liberal Party candidate for Bradford South, finishing third. He left the Liberals and joined the Labour Party. In 1921 and 1922 he was an unsuccessful Labour candidate in the Bradford Borough Council elections. In 1926 he was elected to Bradford Council, representing Manningham ward. In 1929 he was elected to the House of Commons for Kingston upon Hull East, a seat he held until 1931 and again from 1935 to 1945. He was also a Deputy Lieutenant of the West Riding of Yorkshire and a Justice of the Peace for the area. On 17 November 1945 he was raised to the peerage as Baron Calverley, of the City of Bradford in the West Riding of the County of York.

 Family 
Lord Calverley married Ellen Eliza, daughter of Charles William Orford, in 1909. He died in September 1955, aged 78, and was succeeded in the barony by his son George. Lady Calverley died in 1965.

Arms

References

 Kidd, Charles, Williamson, David (editors). Debrett's Peerage and Baronetage'' (1990 edition). New York: St Martin's Press, 1990.
 
 www.thepeerage.com

External links 
 

1877 births
1955 deaths
Deputy Lieutenants of the West Riding of Yorkshire
Muff, George
Muff, George
Muff, George
UK MPs who were granted peerages
Politicians from Bradford
Textile workers
Labour Party (UK) hereditary peers
Liberal Party (UK) parliamentary candidates
Barons created by George VI